Alexander Myakinin (born 1995) is a Russian-born Israeli artistic gymnast.

In 2020, he won the bronze medal in the horizontal bar event at the European Men's Artistic Gymnastics Championships held in Mersin, Turkey.

References

External links
 
 

Living people
1995 births
Place of birth missing (living people)
Israeli male artistic gymnasts